The 2017 India Super Series was the second super series tournament of the 2017 BWF Super Series. The tournament took place in Siri Fort Sports Complex, New Delhi, India from 28 March – 2 April 2017 and had a total purse of $350,000.

Men's singles

Seeds

Top half

Bottom half

Finals

Women's singles

Seeds

Top half

Bottom half

Finals

Men's doubles

Seeds

Top half

Bottom half

Finals

Women's doubles

Seeds

Top half

Bottom half

Finals

Mixed doubles

Seeds

Top half

Bottom half

Finals

References

External links
Tournament Link

2017 BWF Super Series
India Open (badminton)
2017 in Indian sport
Sport in New Delhi